The following is a list of players who have captained the Greater Western Sydney Giants in the Australian Football League (AFL) and AFL Women's.

AFL

AFL Women's

References

Giants go with youth and Power

Lists of Australian Football League captains
Captains
Sydney-sport-related lists